The following is a list of medical schools (or universities with a medical school), in the Middle East.

Middle East

Bahrain

 Arabian Gulf University
 RCSI-Bahrain

Egypt

 Ain Shams University El-Demerdash Faculty of Medicine                   
 Al-Azhar University 
 Faculty of Medicine for Boys
 Faculty of Medicine for Girls
 Asyut Faculty of Medicine for Boys
 Damietta Faculty of Medicine
 Alexandria University Faculty of Medicine
 Arab Academy for Science, Technology and Maritime Transport College of Medicine
 Armed Forces College of Medicine
 Assiut University Faculty of Medicine
 Aswan University Faculty of Medicine
 Badr University in Cairo School of Medicine
 Benha University College of Human Medicine
 Beni Suef University Faculty of Medicine
 Cairo University Kasr Alainy School of Medicine
 Delta University for Science and Technology Faculty of Medicine
 Fayoum University Faculty of Medicine
 Galala University Faculty of Medicine
 Helwan University Faculty of Medicine
 Horus University Faculty of Medicine
 Kafrelsheikh University Faculty of Medicine
 King Salman International University Faculty of Medicine
 Mansoura University Faculty of Medicine
 Menoufia University Faculty of Medicine
 Merit University Faculty of Medicine
 Minia University Faculty of Medicine
 Misr University for Science and Technology College of Medicine
 Modern University for Technology and Information Faculty of Medicine
 Nahda University in Beni Suef Faculty of Medicine
 Newgiza University School of Medicine
 New Mansoura University Faculty of Medicine
 October 6 University Faculty of Medicine
 Port Said University Faculty of Medicine
 Sohag University Faculty of Medicine
 South Valley University Qena Faculty of Medicine
 Suez University Faculty of Medicine
 Suez Canal University Faculty of Medicine
 Tanta University Faculty of Medicine
 Zagazig University Faculty of Medicine

Iran

 Ahvaz Jundishapur University of Medical Sciences
 Ali ebn Abitaleb Yazd Azad University of Medical Sciences
 Arak University of Medical Sciences
 Ardabil University of Medical Sciences
 Azad University of Medical Sciences
 Babol University of Medical Sciences, Babol
 Baqiyatallah Medical Sciences University, Tehran
 Birjand University of Medical Sciences
 Bushehr University of Medical Sciences, Bushehr
 Dezful University of Medical Sciences
 Fasa Faculty of Medical Sciences, Fasa
 Fatemiye University of Medical Sciences, Qom
 Golestan University of Medical Sciences, Gorgan
 Gonabad University of Medical Sciences, Gonabad
 Gorgan University of Medical Sciences
 Guilan University of Medical Sciences, Rasht
 Hamedan University of Medical Sciences, Hamedan
 Hormozgan University of Medical Sciences, Bandar Abbas
 Isfahan University of Medical Sciences, Isfahan
 Medical University of Ilam
 Iran University of Medical Sciences
 Islamic Azad University Tehran Medical Branch
 Islamic Azad University of Arak
 Jahrom University of Medical Sciences, Jahrom
 Kashan University of Medical Sciences, Kashan
 Kerman University of Medical Sciences, Kerman
 Kermanshah University of Medical Sciences, Kermanshah
 Kordestan University of Medical Sciences, Sanandaj
 Lorestan University of Medical Sciences, Khorramabad
 Mashhad University of Medical Sciences
 Mazandaran University of Medical Sciences, Sari
 Medical University of Ilam, Ilam
 Qazvin University of Medical Sciences, Qazvin
 Qom University of Medical Sciences, Qom
 Rafsanjan University of Medical Sciences, Rafsanjan
 Sabzevar School of Medical Sciences, Sabzevar
 Semnan University of Medical Sciences, Semnan
 Shahed University of Medical Sciences, Tehran
 Shahid Beheshti University of Medical Sciences
 Shahid Sadoughi University of Medical Sciences and Health Services
 Shahrekord University of Medical Sciences
 Shahroud University of Medical Sciences
 Shiraz University of Medical Sciences
 Tabriz University of Medical Sciences
 Tehran University of Medical Sciences
 Urmia University of Medical Sciences, Urmia (Oromieh)
 Yasuj University of Medical Sciences, Yasuj
 Yazd University of Medical Sciences
 Zahedan University of Medical Sciences, Zahedan
 Zanjn University of Medical Sciences, Zanjan
 Zabol University of Medical Science

Iraq

 University of Kerbala / college of medicine, Karbala
 University of Duhok / College of Medicine, Duhok
 Thi Qar University / College of Medicine, Thi Qar
 Al-iraqiya university / Ibn Sina Medical College, Baghdad
 University of Kirkuk / college of Medicine, Kirkuk
 University of Baghdad / College of Medicine, Baghdad
 University of Baghdad / Al-Kindy College of Medicine Baghdad
 Al-Nahrain University / College of Medicine, Baghdad
 Al-Mustansiriya University / College of Medicine, Baghdad
 University of Mosul / College of Medicine, Ninawa
 University of Basrah / College of Medicine, Basrah
 University of Babylon / College of Medicine, Babylon
 University of Kufa / College of Medicine, Najaf
 University of Anbar / College of Medicine, Anbar
 University of Tikrit / College of Medicine, Saladdin
 University of Sulaymaniyah / College of Medicine, Sulaimaniyah
 Hawler Medical University / College of Medicine, Erbil,
 University of Al-Qadisiyah/ College of Medicine, Al Diwaniyah
 University of Diyala / College of Medicine, Diyala

Israel
 Ruth and Bruce Rappaport Faculty of Medicine, Technion, Haifa
 Ben-Gurion University of the Negev Medical School for International Health, Beersheba
 Joyce and Irving Goldman Medical School, Ben-Gurion University of the Negev, Beersheba/Negev
 Hebrew University-Hadassah School of Medicine, Hebrew University of Jerusalem, Jerusalem
 Sackler Faculty of Medicine, Tel Aviv University, Tel Aviv
 Medical school of the Bar-Ilan University and Rivka Ziv Hospital, Safed
 Adelson School of Medicine, Ariel University, Ariel

Jordan

 Jordan University of Science and Technology – Faculty of Medicine  Welcome, Irbid
 Hashemite University – Faculty of Medicine , Zarqa
 University of Jordan – Faculty of Medicine , Amman
 Mutah University – Faculty of Medicine , Karak
 Yarmouk University – Faculty of Medicine, Irbid
 Al-Balqa` Applied University – Faculty of Medicine, As-Salt

Kuwait
 Kuwait University

Lebanon
  Lebanese University
  Beirut Arab University
  Saint Joseph University
  University of Balamand
  Lebanese American University
  American University of Beirut
  Holy Spirit University of Kaslik

Oman
 Oman Medical College
 Sultan Qaboos University

Palestine
 Al-Quds University Faculty of Medicine
 An-Najah National University Faculty of Medicine and Health Sciences
 Arab American University Faculty of Medicine
 Hebron University College of Medicine
 Islamic University of Gaza Faculty of Medicine
 Palestine Polytechnic University College of Human Medicine

Qatar
 Weill Cornell Medical College in Qatar
 Qatar University

Saudi Arabia
 College of Medicine in Dawadmi, Shaqra University, Dawadmi
 College of Medicine in Shaqra, Shaqra University, Shaqra
 College of Medicine, University of Bisha, Bisha
 Faculty of Medicine, King Fahad Medical City, Riyadh
 Salman bin abdlaziz university, Al-kharj, College of Medicine in Al-kharj
 Global Colleges  Private medical school in Riyadh. USMLE PREP.is part of the curriculum. Clinical rotation is possible in the UK and in the US.
 Alfaisal University, Riyadh (Private, Non Profit Medical School)
 Imam Muhammad ibn Saud Islamic University, college of medicine,  Riyadh,
 King Abdulaziz University, Jeddah
 King Abdulaziz University, Jizan
 King Saud University, Riyadh, College of medicine.
 University of Dammam, Dammam
 King Faisal University, Al Ahsa
 King Khalid University, Abha
 Umm al-Qura University, Makkah
 Taif University, Taif
 Al Qaseem University Buridah, Alqaseem
 Al Jouf University, Al Jouf
 Taibah University, Madinah
 King Saud bin Abdulaziz University for Health Sciences, Riyadh
 Ibn Sina National College for Medical Studies, Jeddah (Private Medical School)
 Batterjee Medical College, Jeddah (private Medical School)
 University of Hail, Medicine college, Hail Region.
 Tabuk University, Tabuk
 Al-Majmaah University, College of Medicine, Majmaah,
 Unaizah College of Medicine, Unaizah, the first college in Saudi Arabia that gives MD degree as it has a partner with Wright State University.
 University of Almaarefa, Riyadh (private, Medical School)

Syria

 Faculty of Medicine, Damascus University
 Faculty of Medicine, University of Aleppo
 University of Kalamoon
 Faculty of Medicine, Al-Baath University
 Faculty of Medicine, Tishreen University
 Syrian Private University
 Al-Andalus University for Medical Sciences
 Faculty of Medicine, Al-Furat University
 Faculty of Medicine, Hama University
 Faculty of Medicine, Tartous University
 Al Hawash Private University Faculty of Medicine
 Al Sham Private University Faculty of Medicine

United Arab Emirates
 Dubai Medical College for Girls
 Gulf Medical University Ajman
 United Arab Emirates University
 University of Sharjah
 Mohammed Bin Rashid University Of Medicine and Health Sciences
 Ras al-Khaimah Medical and Health Sciences University
Ajman University

Yemen
 Aden University
 Hadhramout University of Science & Technology
 Sana'a University
 University of Science & Technology
 Thamar University
 Ibb University
 Taiz university
 Al-Razi University
  21 September University for Medical and Applied Science.

References

External links
 World Directory of Medical Schools

Middle East
Middle East-related lists